Nicola Di Pinto (born 12 June 1947) is an Italian actor. He appeared in more than seventy films since 1974.

Filmography

References

External links 

1947 births
Living people
Italian male film actors